USS Miramar (SP-672), later USS SP-672, was a United States Navy patrol vessel in commission from 1917 to 1918.

Miramar was built as the private motorboat Lillian II at Long Island City, New York, in 1907. She later was renamed Miramar.

On 18 August 1917, the U.S. Navy acquired Miramar from her owner for use as a section patrol boat during World War I. She was commissioned as USS Miramar (SP-672) on 31 August 1917.

Assigned to the 8th Naval District, Miramar conducted patrols for the rest of World War I. During 1918, her name was changed to USS SP-672.

SP-672 was returned to her owner on 30 December 1918.

Notes

References
 (link is to blank page as of 11 December 2010)
Department of the Navy Naval History and Heritage Command Online Library of Selected Images: U.S. Navy Ships: USS SP-672, 1917-1918. Originally named Miramar (SP-672) Formerly the motor boat Miramar (built in 1907 under the name Lillian II)
NavSource Online: Section Patrol Craft Photo Archive SP-672 ex-Miramar (SP 672)

Patrol vessels of the United States Navy
World War I patrol vessels of the United States
Ships built in Queens, New York
1907 ships